Jochen Figge (born 1947) is a German professional football coach who has managed the national teams of a number of countries, including Nepal, Saint Vincent and the Grenadines, Guinea, Zambia, Trinidad and Tobago, and Ethiopia.

References

1947 births
Living people
German football managers
Nepal national football team managers
Saint Vincent and the Grenadines national football team managers
Guinea national football team managers
Zambia national football team managers
Trinidad and Tobago national football team managers
Ethiopia national football team managers
German expatriate football managers
West German expatriate sportspeople in Nepal
West German expatriate sportspeople in Saint Vincent and the Grenadines
German expatriate sportspeople in Guinea
German expatriate sportspeople in Zambia
German expatriate sportspeople in Trinidad and Tobago
German expatriate sportspeople in Ethiopia
Expatriate football managers in Nepal
Expatriate football managers in Saint Vincent and the Grenadines
Expatriate football managers in Guinea
Expatriate football managers in Zambia
Expatriate football managers in Trinidad and Tobago
Expatriate football managers in Ethiopia
West German football managers
West German expatriate football managers